Maya is an American hour-long adventure television series that aired on NBC, Saturdays from 7:30 p.m. to 8:30 p.m., from September 16, 1967 until February 10, 1968. The series is a follow-up to the 1966 film of the same name, with Jay North and Sajid Khan reprising their roles. Set in the Indian jungle, the series centered on an American boy searching for his missing father, a big game hunter.

Synopsis

The series starred teenage Jay North (famous for starring as Dennis the Menace as a child) as Terry Bowen, and Indian actor Sajid Khan (also prominent in his homeland from his child-acting background) as Raji, a native boy who joined up with the lead. Raji's elephant, Maya, gave the series its name. Maya was Terry and Raji's source of transportation, as well as providing help when flight or rescue was needed.

In the first episode teenage Terry Bowen arrives in India to reunite with his father, who he soon learns is missing, presumed killed by a tiger. Facing deportation back to the United States, Terry escapes the authorities, and meets up by chance with orphaned runaway Raji and his pet elephant, Maya; and the two boys decide to team up to go in search of Terry's father, as Terry is hopeful his father is actually still alive. Over the course of the series the duo and the elephant continue their search while facing many side-plots, but never succeed in their quest in the episodes made during the series' short run.

Episodes

Production
Filmed entirely on location, the series was produced by Frank King, who had also produced the 1966 feature film, Maya, which inspired the series and starred Jay North, Sajid Khan, and Clint Walker as Terry's estranged father, who is never seen in the TV series. The series ended after 18 episodes. It featured guest appearances by several noted Indian character actors, such as Iftekhar, Prem Nath and I. S. Johar.

Japanese singer Rajie got her stage name from the character Raji.

DVD release
On August 19, 2014, Warner Bros. released the complete series on DVD in Region 1 for the very first time via their Warner Archive Collection.  This is a manufacture-on-demand (MOD) release.

References

External links

NBC original programming
1967 American television series debuts
1968 American television series endings
Live action television shows based on films
Television series by MGM Television
Television shows set in India
Television series about elephants